Rockenhausen is a former Verbandsgemeinde ("collective municipality") in the Donnersbergkreis, in Rhineland-Palatinate, Germany. The seat of the Verbandsgemeinde was in Rockenhausen. On 1 January 2020 it was merged into the new Verbandsgemeinde Nordpfälzer Land.

The Verbandsgemeinde Rockenhausen consisted of the following Ortsgemeinden ("local municipalities"):

Former Verbandsgemeinden in Rhineland-Palatinate
North Palatinate